The .475 Linebaugh is a rimmed revolver cartridge developed by John Linebaugh in the late 1980s in response to the scarcity of the .348 Winchester brass required to form his .500 Linebaugh cartridge. The cartridge is based on the .45-70 Government case trimmed to 1.4 inches and loaded with  bullets. While dimensionally similar to the older .45 Silhouette cartridge, the .475 Linebaugh is loaded to considerably higher pressures, resulting in significantly different ballistic performance.

The .475 Linebaugh was first announced in the May 1988 issue of Guns & Ammo in an article written by Ross Seyfried. In 1991, Linebaugh announced a 1.6 inch variant of the .475 Linebaugh for use in converted Ruger .357 Maximum revolvers. This cartridge is known as the .475 Linebaugh Long or .475 Linebaugh Maximum, and produces somewhat greater ballistic performance than the shorter round.

Usage
The .475 Linebaugh is intended primarily for hunting and defense against big game. The .475 Linebaugh is ballistically comparable to the .454 Casull, .500 Linebaugh, and "Trapdoor level" loadings of the .45-70 Government, though it is less powerful than the .460 S&W Magnum, .500 Wyoming Express, .500 S&W Magnum, and .500 Bushwhacker rounds, as well as Linebaugh's own .475 and .500 Maximum cartridges. With the exception of the .500 Wyoming Express, however, the .475 Linebaugh is generally chambered in lighter and more compact revolvers than such "super magnum" cartridges, lending itself to easier carry and field use. This results in a relatively high power-to-weight ratio which, in the absence of a muzzle brake, often entails greater felt recoil than produced by heavier firearms chambered in more powerful cartridges.

In 2003, Ruger introduced the .480 Ruger, which is essentially a .475 Linebaugh shortened to 1.285 inches with a marginally lower pressure ceiling (48,000 psi for the .480 Ruger vs. 50,000 psi for the .475 Linebaugh). The performance and recoil generated by the .480 Ruger with standard loadings are comparatively less than those of the .475 Linebaugh. Furthermore, just as the .38 Special cartridge will chamber and fire in revolvers chambered for the more powerful .357 Magnum, the .480 Ruger will chamber and fire in revolvers chambered for the .475 Linebaugh. However, given their comparable operating pressures, the two rounds are far closer in performance than such a comparison would seem to suggest.

The .475 Linebaugh remains a relatively obscure cartridge, owing in part to the commercial success of Smith & Wesson's more powerful .460 S&W Magnum and .500 S&W Magnum cartridges. However, while the .475 Linebaugh was once an exclusively custom proposition, both the Freedom Arms Model 83 and the Magnum Research BFR are currently available in the cartridge.

See also
.500 Linebaugh
12 mm caliber
List of handgun cartridges

References

475 Linebaugh
Wildcat cartridges